Codex B may refer to various ancient documents:
Codex Vaticanus, also known as "Codex Vaticanus B", an early Greek copy of the Bible
Codex B, the first version of the Samaritan Pentateuch to become known in the west
Codex Vaticanus B, a pictorial Mexican manuscript in the Vatican Library